Jaenicke is a surname. Notable people with the surname include:

 Anja Jaenicke (born 1963), German actress
 Frank Jaenicke (1892–1951), Co-operative Commonwealth Federation member of the Canadian House of Commons
 Hannes Jaenicke (born 1960), German actor

See also
 Jänicke (disambiguation)